The Ridnauntal is a side valley of the Eisacktal in South Tyrol, Italy. It lies within the municipal boundaries of Ratschings.
A formerly minerary region (silver, zinc), it is nowadays known as a venue for winter sports, biathlon in particular.

References 
 Official homepage of the Ridnauntal

External links 

Valleys of South Tyrol